Spirou is a platform game developed and published by Infogrames during 1995 and 1996 for the Mega Drive, Super NES, and Game Boy video game consoles, and for Microsoft Windows and MS-DOS. A Game Gear version was planned, but scrapped, though a prototype version with the full completed game was leaked online. 

The game is based on the Spirou et Fantasio comic book series. It features the adventure of Spirou trying to save his kidnapped friend Count Champignac and stop his arch-enemy Cyanida from making robots rule the earth. The game was noted for its good graphics and for being faithful to Spirou et Fantasio the comic book series, but due to the relatively high difficulty, most reviewers only recommended the game for true fans of the comic book series.

Gameplay
Spirou is a platformer type of video game where the titular main character with the same name can walk, run, jump and duck. In order to reach some areas he can dive and slide on the ground for a distance. Also, he can shoot with a gun called the Micropulser that is earned in the fourth level of the game. Spirou can swim in the underwater levels apparent in the game.

Spirou has a health bar that allows him to take six hits before he loses a life. If the player has extra lives left when losing a life, the level restarts completely. If there are no extra lives left, the game is over. An extra life is earned by collecting 50 Spirou hats, which are scattered throughout the eight levels. Collecting a heart refills his health bar by one point. While diving under the water, Spirou can only hold his breath for a certain amount of time. The time under water can be extended by collecting oxygen bottles.

A password feature gives the player the option to continue playing the game. However, there is only one valid password that always restarts the player in the middle of the game. The game supports three levels of difficulty: Easy, medium and hard. There is also a sound test feature in the game.

Plot
Spirou, a journalist, and his friend Fantasio visit New York for an international conference of scientific research. When the pair arrives at the conference, Count Champignac, their long-time friend and one of the inventors at the conference, has disappeared. It turns out that Cyanide, a robot and one of Spirou's long time enemies, has kidnapped the count. With Count Champignac's inventions, Cyanide's intention is to make robots rule the earth and make all humans into slaves. While Spirou tries to save Champignac and stop Cyanida, Fantasio gathers intel in order to help Spirou.

Reception

The Mega Drive, SNES and Game Boy versions of Spirou were reviewed in several video game magazines in France and Germany. It was generally well received, most critics noting the graphics and fluid animations in both the console and Game Boy versions. In addition, the soundtrack and varying gameplay fared well with critics and the controls of the game were noted for being precise and easy to use. Most critics also considered the game to be faithful to the comic series. On the other hand, the difficulty level of the gameplay was criticized for being too high. Also, due to the inclusion of only one password to save progress some reviewers meant that too many levels had to be replayed to get to the point in the game where the player had been. In the end, most reviewers recommended the game for hardcore fans of the genre.

References

 Reference group b

1995 video games
Action video games
Cancelled Game Gear games
Europe-exclusive video games
Game Boy games
Infogrames games
Platform games
Sega Genesis games
Spirou et Fantasio
Super Nintendo Entertainment System games
Video games based on comics
Video games developed in France
Video games scored by Alberto Jose González
Single-player video games